In 2011, the Gulf Volleyball Clubs Champions Championship comprised eight teams, divided into two groups.

Pools composition

Preliminary round

Pool A

|}

Source: kooora.com (Arabic)

References

GCC Volleyball Club Championship